Grange is a townland in County Westmeath, Ireland.

Grange is one of 22 townlands of the civil parish of Kilbixy in the barony of Moygoish in the Province of Leinster. 
The neighbouring townlands are: Tristernagh Demesne to the north, Farrow to the east, Piercefield or Templeoran to the east, Ballyhug to the south and Ballyhoreen and Tristernagh to the west.

In the 1911 census of Ireland there were 11 houses and 48 inhabitants in the townland.

See also

There are two other townlands called Grange in County Westmeath:
Grange, Kilcumreragh
Grange, Lackan

References

External links
Grange at the IreAtlas Townland Data Base
Grange at Townlands.ie
Grange at Logainm.ie

Townlands of County Westmeath